The 2016 Asian Formula Renault Series (aka AFR Series) is the 17th season of the AFR Series since its creation in 2000 by FRD. The season began on 19 March at the Zhuhai International Circuit and will end on 23 October at the Zhejiang International Circuit after six double-header events. For the first time, the series will travel to Korea and Thailand, hosting a round at Yeongam and Buriram respectively; the rest of the rounds will be held in China.

Starting from previous season, drivers and teams compete in two classes, Class A for drivers and teams competing with the 2013 FR2.0 car, and Class B for drivers and teams using the FR2.0 old spec cars.

As part of an enhanced agreement with Renault Sport, the season will feature a scholarship program for young Chinese drivers, called Road to Champion. The winner among these drivers over the last three rounds of the championship will secure a link to race the following year in Europe with the help of Renault Sport.

Teams and drivers

Race calendar and results

Championship standings

Points system

Points are awarded to the top 14 classified finishers. Drivers in classes A and B are classified separately.

Drivers' Championships

Road to Champion Division

References

External links
 

Formula Renault seasons
2016 in Chinese motorsport
Asian Formula Renault